Adam Walne (born 3 October 1990), also known by the nickname of "Waldo", is an English professional rugby league footballer who plays as a  for the Barrow Raiders in the RFL championship 1.

He played for Salford in the Super League, spending time on loan from the Reds at Workington Town and the Barrow Raiders. In 2018 he spent time on loan from Huddersfield at the Leigh Centurions in the Betfred Championship.

Background
Walne was born in Greater Manchester, England.

Playing career

Salford
Walne joined Salford from amateur club Leyland ARLFC, from Leyland near Preston. He made his début for the club on 20 August 2012 in a Super League match against Wigan at the DW Stadium.

Dual registration
In 2012 and 2013, Walne was dual registered with Championship club Workington Town. He also spent some time dual registered with Barrow of Championship 1 in 2014.

Huddersfield
In September 2017, it was announced that Walne had joined the Huddersfield Giants on a three-year deal from 2018.

Barrow Raiders
In was announced in September 2020 that Walne would join his brother at Barrow Raiders on a 2-year deal

References

External links
Huddersfield Giants profile
Salford profile
SL profile

1990 births
Living people
Barrow Raiders players
English rugby league players
Huddersfield Giants players
Leigh Leopards players
Rugby league players from Greater Manchester
Rugby league props
Salford Red Devils players
Workington Town players